Dejan Pajić (born 15 August 1989 in Šabac) is a Serbian sprint canoer  who has competed since the late 2000s. He won a bronze medal in the K-2 500 m event at the 2010 ICF Canoe Sprint World Championships in Poznań.

References
  - accessed 22 August 2010.
 Pescara2009.it profile.

External links
 
 

1989 births
Living people
Serbian male canoeists
ICF Canoe Sprint World Championships medalists in kayak
Canoeists at the 2016 Summer Olympics
Olympic canoeists of Serbia
Mediterranean Games bronze medalists for Serbia
Competitors at the 2009 Mediterranean Games
Mediterranean Games medalists in canoeing